Kim Hyun-soo is the name of:
 Kim Hyun-su (born February 1973), South Korean association football player, formerly of Jeonnam Dragons
 Kim Hyun-soo (footballer, born March 1973), South Korean association football player, formerly of Busan Daewoo Royals
 Kim Hyun-soo (volleyball) (born 1986), South Korean volleyball player
 Hyun-soo Kim (born 1988), South Korean baseball player
 Kim Hyun-soo (actress) (born 2000), South Korean actress
 Kim Hyun-soo (ice hockey), South Korean ice hockey player
 Kim Hyeon-soo (born 1961), South Korean politician
 Kim Hyun-soo (rugby union)